Shah Ismayil may refer to:

Shah Ismayil, a 16th century Shah of Persia
Shah Ismayil (opera), an opera by Muslim Magomayev
Shah Ismail (footballer)
Shah Ismail Order, an  Azerbaijani military award
Shah Ismail Dehlvi, 19th century Islamic scholar